The Thailand Rally, also known as the Rally of Thailand, is an international rally racing event based in Bangkok, Thailand. The event is a round of the Asia-Pacific Rally Championship Asia Cup, the Tri-Nations Rally series and the Thailand Rally Championship.

The centrepiece of the Thailand Rally Championship, the rally was first in 1989 and joined the Asia-Pacific Rally Championship (APRC) in 1992. It remained a long-running component of the championship, frequently as the first or last round. It ran through the APRC's heyday when it was seen as a junior series for future World Rally Championship stars and was won by drivers like Tommi Makinen and Colin McRae. Malaysian driver Karamjit Singh has had the most success with three victories. The rally was dropped from the APRC after the 2003 event, returned for 2005 and was dropped again. In 2013 the rally returned to the APRC as a candidate round and also a final round of the APRC Asia Cup, although it will not count for overall APRC points.

List of winners
Sourced in part from:

References

External links
Official website
Asia Pacific Championship

Rally competitions in Thailand
Thailand
1989 establishments in Thailand
Recurring sporting events established in 1989